Frank País is a municipality in the Holguín Province of Cuba. The municipal seat is located in the town of Cayo Mambí. The municipality was named for the revolutionary Frank País.

Demographics
In 2004, the municipality of Frank País had a population of 25,621.

See also
List of cities in Cuba
Municipalities of Cuba

References

External links

Populated places in Holguín Province